Newmarket Racecourse is a British Thoroughbred horse racing venue in Newmarket, Suffolk, comprising two individual racecourses: the Rowley Mile and the July Course. Newmarket is often referred to as the headquarters of British horseracing and is home to the largest cluster of training yards in the country and many key horse racing organisations, including Tattersalls, the National Horseracing Museum and the National Stud. Newmarket hosts two of the country's five Classic Races – the 1,000 Guineas and 2,000 Guineas, and numerous other Group races.  In total, it hosts 9 of British racing's 36 annual Group 1 races.

History

Racing in Newmarket was recorded in the time of James I. The racecourse itself was founded in 1636. Around 1665, Charles II inaugurated the Newmarket Town Plate and in 1671 became the first and only reigning monarch to ride a winner. King Charles was known to attend races on Newmarket Heath with his brother, the future James II. The first recorded race was a match for £100 between horses owned by Lord Salisbury and Marquess of Buckingham in 1622.
  
Up until 1744, the two most valuable races run at the course were the King's Plate and the Town Plate.  Two more Plate races were added in that year, paid for by local traders, both worth 50 guineas – one was a race for five-year-olds carrying 9 stone, one was an open age race in four mile heats.  Another paid for by landowners was a four-year-old race over four miles, each carrying 8 stone 7 lbs.  At that time, formal races at Newmarket only took place twice a year – once in April, once in October.  A second Spring meeting was added in 1753., a second October meeting in 1762, the July meeting in 1765, the Houghton meeting in 1770 and the Craven in 1771.

By 1840, there were seven annual meetings:

The Craven Meeting – a week, beginning Easter Monday (inaugurated 1771)
1st Spring Meeting – a week, beginning Easter Monday fortnight (inaugurated pre-1744)
2nd Spring Meeting – a week, beginning Easter Monday month (inaugurated 1753)
July Meeting – a few days, around 10 July (inaugurated 1765)
1 October Meeting – a week, beginning Monday before the first Thursday in October (inaugurated pre-1744)
2 October Meeting – a week, beginning Monday before the third Thursday in October (inaugurated 1762)
Houghton Meeting – a few days, beginning two weeks later (inaugurated in 1770)

Layout
Newmarket Racecourse is made up of two courses – the Rowley Mile Course (named after Old Rowley the favourite racehorse of King Charles II) and the July Course. Both are wide, galloping tracks used for Flat racing only, each with a capacity just over 20,000, though this is rarely met.

The Rowley Mile Course has a 1-mile 2 furlong (2 km) straight with minor undulations towards 'The Bushes', two furlongs (400 m) out. The penultimate furlong (200 m) is downhill and the last is uphill, forming 'The Dip'. Races beyond the distance of 1m 2f start on the 'Cesarewitch' or 'Beacon' course which turns right-handed into the straight.
The July Course, also sometimes called the Summer Course, has a 1-mile (1600 m) straight, known as 'The Bunbury Mile'. After 2 furlongs (400 m), there is a long downhill stretch before the uphill furlong (200 m) to the finish. This course also uses the 'Cesarewitch/Beacon' course for longer distances, again turning right into the straight.

Technically, there is also a third course, the Round Course, first called the King's Plate Course but this is only used once a year for the Newmarket Town Plate, a race of great historical significance, but limited importance in modern-day racing.

The Rowley Mile is used for racing in the Spring and Autumn, and hosts the majority of the Group 1 races staged at Newmarket, including the 2000 & 1000 Guineas. Up until 2010, it was the home of the Champion Stakes, Pride Stakes and Jockey Club Cup, which are now run as the Champion Stakes, British Champions Fillies' and Mares' Stakes and British Champions Long Distance Cup at Ascot on British Champions Day. The wide nature of the track means it is able to host races such as the Cambridgeshire Handicap and the Cesarewitch Handicap , which both have a maximum field size of 35, making them the largest fields for races in the UK after the Grand National. In 2005, the Rowley Mile hosted the now defunct Ascot Festival, the premier race of which was the Queen Elizabeth II Stakes, whilst the new grandstand at Ascot was being constructed.

The July Course is used in Summer, and hosts 2 Group 1 races, the July Cup and the Falmouth Stakes, both of which are run at the July Festival, the premier meeting staged at the July Course. The course is also used for several evening meetings a year, with live music after racing – these often draw a sellout crowd and are typically the highest attended of any meetings held at Newmarket throughout the year. In 1999 the entire Newmarket programme was moved to the July Course whilst the new Millennium Grandstand at the Rowley Mile was being constructed. In 2008, due to waterlogging at York, several races from the Ebor Festival were staged at the July Course, including three Group 1 races – the Yorkshire Oaks, the Nunthorpe and the Juddmonte International.

Both courses have grass airstrips for use by light aircraft, and it was taking off from one of these in June 2000, that a Piper Seneca plane carrying jockeys Ray Cochrane and Frankie Dettori crashed, killing the pilot and injuring both jockeys. The plane was headed for Goodwood in Sussex. Cochrane received the Queen's Commendation for Bravery in 2002 for saving Dettori's life.  The airstrips on the Rowley Mile were used during the Second World War by the Royal Air Force (RAF) as RAF Newmarket- the most important races were moved to the July Course during this period, which was the only racecourse in the UK that remained operational throughout the war. The Devil's Dyke runs past the edge of the July course. About half of the racecourse complex, including the July and Cesarewitch/Beacon courses, is actually in the neighbouring county of Cambridgeshire.

Historically, there are various names that have been given to courses or parts of courses at Newmarket, and some are still in use today to describe particular race distances.  Whyte's History of the British Turf (1840), for instance, lists the Beacon Course, Round Course, Audley End Course, Clermont Course, Ancaster Mile, Rowley Mile, Abingdon Mile, Bunbury Mile, Ditch Mile and Yearling Course.

In the late 19th and early 20th Century Newmarket also had a National Hunt course. The Links Gallops uses the course today and some of the buildings still stand adjacent to the Gallops and nearby road.

Notable races 
The King's Plate (or Queen's Plate) was a major race run between 1634 and 1765.

Current races include:

Locations

 (Location of Carpark)

 (Rowley Mile)

 (July Course)

See also 
Newbury Racecourse

References

Bibliography

Course guide on GG.COM
Course guide on At The Races

 
Horse racing venues in England
Sports venues in Suffolk
Sports venues completed in 1744
1744 establishments in England